Boubaker Ayadi, also spelled Aboub-baker Al-Ayadi (born March 6, 1949, in Jendouba) is a Tunisian author.

Boubaker has lived in Paris since 1988 and has published several books in Arabic and French.

Biography
Boubaker completed high school in Jendouba and attended university in Tripoli, Besançon then Paris. He has been a teacher since October 1967. He wrote for the Tunisian newspaper al-Sabah from 1980 to 1987.

Selected works
 The Sultan dream (Arabic), 2006
 The naked man (Arabic), 2009
 Asfour le devin (French), 2010
 The Omen 2007 (French), 2008

See also 
 Maghrebian community of Paris

References

Living people
Tunisian writers
1949 births
People from Jendouba Governorate
Tunisian male writers